The 2009 Southland Conference men's basketball tournament, a part of the 2008-09 NCAA Division I men's basketball season, will take place March 12–15, 2009 at the Merrell Center in Katy, Texas.  The winner of the tournament will receive the Southland Conference's automatic bid to the 2009 NCAA Tournament.

Format
The top eight eligible men's basketball teams in the Southland Conference receive a berth in the conference tournament.  After the conference season, teams are seeded by conference record. The first round match-ups will be as shown below.

Bracket

All times Eastern.

Championship game

In the title game, Stephen F. Austin won their first conference title and clinched their first birth to the Division I NCAA Men’s Basketball Championship. Matt Kingsley, a fifth-year senior, led the Lumberjacks with 20 points in the 68–57 win over Texas-San Antonio. Kingsley was named the tournament MVP. The Lumberjacks also got 16 points apiece from Eddie Williams and Josh Alexander.

Devin Gibson led UTSA with a game-high 23 points. While the game was close throughout, SFA never trailed in the first half, and led 37–28 at halftime. They closed the first half on a 20–6 run that culminated with a three-pointer from Walt Harris. Despite Gibson's best efforts, the Roadrunners never got closer than five points behind the second half.

The Lumberjacks became the fifteenth different team to win the Southland Conference Tournament.

References

External links
Southland website
2009 Southland Basketball Tournament website

Southland Conference men's basketball tournament
2008–09 Southland Conference men's basketball season
Southland Conference men's basketball tournament
Southland Conference men's basketball tournament
Sports competitions in Katy, Texas
College basketball tournaments in Texas